Anne Vernon (born Édith Antoinette Alexandrine Vignaud; born 7 January 1924) is a French former actress. She appeared in 40 films between 1948 and 1970, including three films that were entered into the main competition at the Cannes Film Festival. She is perhaps best known today for her role as Madame Emery, the umbrella-shop owner, in Jacques Demy's 1964 musical The Umbrellas of Cherbourg, starring Catherine Deneuve. She was born in Saint-Denis.

Filmography

 The Murdered Model (1948)
 Warning to Wantons (1949)
 Thus Finishes the Night (1949)
 Shakedown (1950)
 Pact with the Devil (1950)
 A Tale of Five Cities (1951)
 Rue des Saussaies (1951)
 Edward and Caroline (1951)
 The Mistress of Treves (1952)
 Song of Paris (1952)
 Massacre in Lace (1952)
 Time Bomb (1953)
 Rue de l'Estrapade (1953)
 Jeunes Maries (1953)
 The Love Lottery (1954)
 Das Fräulein von Scuderi (1955)
 Beautiful but Dangerous (1955)
 Bel Ami (1955)
 The Affair of the Poisons (1955)
 The Width of the Pavement (1956)
 Ce Soir les Jupons Volent (1956)
 Soupcons (aka The Staircase) (1956)
 Fric Frac en Detelles (aka Robbery in Old Lace)
 Les Suspects (1957)
 Les Lavandières du Portugal (1957)
 Count Max (1957)
 Police Judiciaire (1958)
 La Jaconde: Historie d'une Obsesssion (short) (1958)
 General Della Rovere (1959)
 El Casco Blanco (1959)
 Laura Nuda (1961)
 Reves d'amour (aka Dreams of Love) (1962) (TV Movie)
 Arsene Lupin contre Arsene Lupin (aka Arsene Lupin vs Sherlock Holmes) (1962)
 Le Tartuffe (1962) (TV Movie)
 Dernier Amour (1963) (TV Movie)
 The Umbrellas of Cherbourg (1964)
 Friend of the Family (aka Patate) (1964)
 Bonjour Tristesse (1965) (TV Movie)
 Illusions Perdues (aka Lost Illusions) (1965) (TV Series)
 Trap for the Assassin (1966)
 L'Homme de Mykonos (aka Man from Mykonos) (1966)
 The Sea Pirate (aka The Fighting Corsair) (1966)
 The Thief (1967) (scenes deleted in final cut)
 Malican peres et fils (1967) (TV Series)
 The Woman is a Stranger (1968)
 Therese and Isabelle (1968)
 Au Theatre ce Soir (1969) (TV Series)
 Le Cyborg ou Le Voyage Vertical (1970) (TV Movie)
 Mauregard (1970) (TV Series)
 Les Dernieres volontes de Richard Lagrange (TV Series) (1972)
 Pont Dormant (1972) (TV Series)

References

External links
 
 

1924 births
Living people
French film actresses
People from Saint-Denis, Seine-Saint-Denis
20th-century French actresses